Raymond Cicci (11 August 1929 – 20 February 2012) was a French footballer. He played in one match for the France national football team in 1953. He was also named in France's squad for the Group 4 qualification tournament for the 1954 FIFA World Cup.

References

External links
 

1929 births
2012 deaths
French footballers
France international footballers
Sportspeople from Moselle (department)
Association football midfielders
Stade de Reims players
Limoges FC players